The Fable of the Kid Who Shifted His Ideals to Golf and Finally Became a Baseball Fan and Took the Only Known Cure is a 1916 American short comedy silent film pertaining to baseball, the director unnamed and distributed by Golden Film Company. Filming taking place in Chicago, it was released in cinemas on October 4, 1916, in the United States.

References

External links

1916 films
American silent short films
American black-and-white films
1916 comedy films
1916 short films
Silent American comedy films
American comedy short films
1910s English-language films
1910s American films